Prorva may refer to:

Prorva, a village until 1998 in the Neftchala Rayon of Azerbaijan
Prorva, Atyrau, Kazakhstan
Prorva (film), a.k.a. Moscow Parade, a 1992 Russian film
Prorva (river),  a river in Belarus
Prorva Channel, a channel in the Danube delta, in Ukraine